Archaeonycteridae (formerly spelled Archaeonycterididae) is a family of extinct bats. It was originally erected by the Swiss naturalist Pierre Revilliod as Archaeonycterididae to hold the genus Archaeonycteris. It was formerly classified under the superfamily Icaronycteroidea (disused) by Kurten and Anderson in 1980. In 2007, the spelling was corrected to Archaeonycteridae and it was reclassified to the unranked clade Microchiropteramorpha by Smith et al.. The family Palaeochiropterygidae was also merged into Archaeonycteridae by Kurten and Anderson, but modern authorities specializing in bat fossils maintain the distinction between the two.

They existed from the Ypresian to the Lutetian ages of the Middle Eocene epoch (55.8 to 40.4 million years ago).

The family is known to closely resemble modern bat species from the well preserved specimens found in the Messel Pit Fossil Site in Germany. Other discoveries were made in Europe and other areas of the Northern Hemisphere that restricted the known distribution range to sites associated with the Laurasian land mass. This range of the family was extended to include a species found in 1990 at the Murgon fossil site on the Australian continent, and they appear to have become globally dispersed during the early Miocene.

Genera
It contains four genera. The following list may be incomplete or inaccurate:
Archaeonycteris Revilliod, 1917
Archaeonycteris trigonodon Revilliod, 1917 - Messel Pit (Lutetian), Germany
Archaeonycteris pollex Storch & Habersetzer, 1988 - Messel Pit (Lutetian), Germany
Archaeonycteris brailloni Russell et al., 1973 - Avenay quarry (Ypresian), France
Archaeonycteris storchi Smith et al., 2007 - Vastan Lignite Mines (Ypresian), India
Australonycteris Hand, Novacek, Godthelp & Archer, 1994
Australonycteris clarkae Hand, Novacek, Godthelp & Archer, 1994 - Murgon fossil site (Ypresian), Australia
Matthesia Smith and Storch 1981
Matthesia germanica
Matthesia insolita
Protonycteris Smith et al., 2007
Protonycteris gunnelli Smith et al., 2007 - Vastan Lignite Mine (Ypresian), India
Xylonycteris Hand & Sigé, 2017
Xylonycteris stenodon Hand & Sigé, 2017 - Ypresian, France

References

Eocene bats
Bat families
Ypresian first appearances
Lutetian extinctions